The 2012 Rio Quente Resorts Tennis Classic was a professional tennis tournament played on hard courts. It was the first edition of the tournament which was part of the 2012 ATP Challenger Tour. It took place in Rio Quente, Brazil between 7 and 12 May 2012.

Singles main-draw entrants

Seeds

 1 Rankings are as of April 30, 2012.

Other entrants
The following players received wildcards into the singles main draw:
  Tiago Fernandes
  Pedro Guimares
  Bruno Sant'anna
  Marcelo Tebet Filho

The following players received entry from the qualifying draw:
  Andrea Collarini
  Eduardo Dischinger
  Augusto Laranja
  Ivo Minář

Champions

Singles

 Guilherme Clezar def.  Paul Capdeville, 7–6(7–4), 6–3

Doubles

 Guido Andreozzi /  Marcel Felder def.  Thiago Alves /  Augusto Laranja, 6–3, 6–3

External links
Official Website

Rio Quente Resorts Tennis Classic
Rio Quente Resorts Tennis Classic
Rio